KJCM (100.3 FM) is a radio station licensed to Snyder, Oklahoma, United States. The station broadcasts a sports format and is currently owned by Fuchs Radio L.L.C.

Translators

Previous logo

References

External links

JCM